The 2013 Rugby League World Cup knockout stage took place after the group stage of the 2013 Rugby League World Cup and culminated in the 2013 Rugby League World Cup Final.

The quarter-finals consistrf of eight teams; 1st, 2nd and 3rd from Group A and Group B, and the remaining two places being taken up by the winners of Group C and Group D.

Bracket

All times are local - British Summer Time (UTC+01 until 26 October, UTC+00 from 27 October) in British or Irish venues - Central European Summer Time (UTC+02 until 26 October, UTC+01/CET from 27 October)

Quarter-finals

New Zealand vs Scotland

Australia vs United States

England vs France

Samoa vs Fiji

Semi-final

New Zealand vs England

Australia vs Fiji

Final: New Zealand vs Australia

References

2013 Rugby League World Cup